László Ur (born 5 March 1988) is a Hungarian professional footballer who plays for Kazincbarcika.

Club statistics

Updated to games played as of 27 June 2020.

References

External links

1988 births
Living people
People from Nyíregyháza
Hungarian footballers
Association football defenders
Nyíregyháza Spartacus FC players
Tuzsér SE footballers
Bőcs KSC footballers
Mezőkövesdi SE footballers
Cigánd SE players
Kaposvári Rákóczi FC players
Kazincbarcikai SC footballers
Nemzeti Bajnokság I players
Nemzeti Bajnokság II players
Nemzeti Bajnokság III players
Sportspeople from Szabolcs-Szatmár-Bereg County